Terence Ian Gray (born 3 June 1954 in Bradford) is an English former professional footballer who played nearly 400 games as a midfielder in the Football League for Huddersfield Town, Southend United, Bradford City and Preston North End.

References

1954 births
Living people
English footballers
Association football midfielders
Huddersfield Town A.F.C. players
Southend United F.C. players
Bradford City A.F.C. players
Preston North End F.C. players
Goole Town F.C. players
English Football League players
Footballers from Bradford